Shorea dasyphylla is an endangered species of plant in the family Dipterocarpaceae. It is found in Sumatra and Borneo.

References

dasyphylla
Trees of Sumatra
Trees of Borneo
Flora of Sarawak
Endangered flora of Asia
Taxonomy articles created by Polbot